Abell 2744, nicknamed Pandora's Cluster, is a giant galaxy cluster resulting from the simultaneous pile-up of at least four separate, smaller galaxy clusters that took place over a span of 350 million years, and is located approximately 4 billion light years from Earth. The galaxies in the cluster make up less than five percent of its mass. The gas (around 20 percent) is so hot that it shines only in X-rays. Dark matter makes up around 75 percent of the cluster's mass.

This cluster also shows a radio halo along with several other Abell clusters. It has a strong central halo, along with an extended tail, which could either be relic radiation, or an extension of the central halo.

Renato Dupke, a member of the team that discovered the Cluster, explained the origin of the name in an interview: "We nicknamed it ‘Pandora's Cluster’ because so many different and strange phenomena were unleashed by the collision."

Gallery

See also
 Abell 370
 Abell catalogue
 List of Abell clusters
 X-ray Astronomy

References

External links
 Image in the visible spectra -Hubble spacetelescope(Lars Holm Nielsen et al) retrieved 20/09/2011
 Video simulation of the merging events that created Abell 2744- Hubble space telescope (Lars Holm Nielsen et al) retrieved 20/09/2011

2744
Sculptor (constellation)
Abell richness class 3
Galaxy clusters